Uma Nair (born 17 April 1977) is an Indian film and television actress who works predominantly in Malayalam-language soap operas. She has appeared over 70 serials. She is best known for playing the supporting role of Nirmala in Vanambadi.

Filmography

Films
 All films are in Malayalam unless noted otherwise.

Television

Special appearances

Awards
South Indian Cinema and Television Awards 2019
Socialist Samskarika Kendra Mother Theresa Puraskaram 2022 - Best Character Role

References

External links
 

Living people
Actresses in Malayalam television
Actresses in Malayalam cinema
Indian film actresses
Indian television actresses
21st-century Indian actresses
1977 births